Assim Omer Al Haj Madibo (born 22 October 1996) is a Qatari footballer who plays for Al-Duhail and the Qatar national team.

Club career
Madibo started his youth football career at French club AJ Auxerre, even though he never lived there. In 2015, he graduated from Aspire Academy in Qatar.

In January 2015, Madibo joined the senior team of Austrian club LASK Linz. He made his professional league debut against Austria Lustenau on 13 August 2015. In January 2016, he left the club to join Cultural Leonesa.

It was announced that in July 2017 that Madibo was loaned to Belgian First Division A side Eupen from Lekhwiya for a duration of one season.

International career
Being born in Qatar from a Sudanese family, Madibo was eligible to represent either Qatar or Sudan, of which he chose the former. Madibo has represented his country at various age groups. He was a member of Qatar national under-19 football team for 2014 AFC U-19 Championship, and he won the championship. He played in 2015 FIFA U-20 World Cup as Qatar national under-20 football team.

Honours

Al-Duhail
Qatar Stars League: 2016–17, 2019–20
Emir of Qatar Cup: 2019
Qatari Sheikh Jassim Cup: 2016

Qatar U19
 AFC U-19 Championship: 2014

Qatar
AFC Asian Cup: 2019

References

External links
 
 
 

1996 births
Living people
People from Doha
Qatari footballers
Qatari expatriate footballers
2. Liga (Austria) players
LASK players
Cultural Leonesa footballers
Lekhwiya SC players
K.A.S. Eupen players
Al-Duhail SC players
Al-Gharafa SC players
Association football midfielders
Qatari people of Sudanese descent
Aspire Academy (Qatar) players
Austrian Regionalliga players
Austrian 2. Landesliga players
Segunda División B players
Qatar Stars League players
AFC Asian Cup-winning players
2019 AFC Asian Cup players
2019 Copa América players
2021 CONCACAF Gold Cup players
Expatriate footballers in France
Expatriate footballers in Belgium
Expatriate footballers in Austria
Expatriate footballers in Spain
Qatari expatriate sportspeople in France
Qatari expatriate sportspeople in Belgium
Qatari expatriate sportspeople in Austria
Qatari expatriate sportspeople in Spain
Qatar international footballers
Qatar youth international footballers
Qatar under-20 international footballers
2022 FIFA World Cup players